Sediminibacillus massiliensis is a Gram-positive, moderately halophilic, aerobic, rod-shaped and motile bacterium from the genus of Sediminibacillus which has been isolated from human feaces from Dielmo in Senegal.

References

 

Bacillaceae
Bacteria described in 2017